The S2 6.9, also marketed as the S2 6.9 Grand Slam, is an American trailerable sailboat that was designed by Don Wennersten and Graham & Schlageter as racer-cruiser and first built in 1983. The designation indicates the approximate length overall in meters.

The S2 6.9 is a development of the 1980 S2 6.7. It was later developed into the wing keel-equipped S2 22 in 1985.

Production
The design was built by S2 Yachts in Holland, Michigan, United States from 1983 until 1986, with 174 boats completed, but it is now out of production.

Design
The S2 6.9 was derived from the 6.7 and used the same Wennersten-designed hull. S2 Yachts engaged Graham & Schlageter to make changes to the cockpit, cabin, sailplan and the keel, however the result was a boat that was no faster than the 6.7.

The S2 6.9 is a recreational keelboat, built predominantly of fiberglass, with wood trim. It has a fractional sloop rig, a raked stem, a plumb transom, a transom-hung rudder controlled by a tiller and a lifting keel operated via a winch from the cockpit. It displaces  and carries  of ballast.

The boat is normally fitted with a small  outboard motor for docking and maneuvering.

The design has sleeping accommodation for four people, with a double "V"-berth in the bow cabin and two straight settees in the main cabin. The galley is located on the port side just aft of the bow cabin and is equipped with an ice box. The head is located just aft of the bow cabin on the starboard side, beside the keel trunk.

Operational history
In a 2010 review Steve Henkel wrote, "best features: The ten-inch draft and smooth bottom with keel up makes her easy to launch and retrieve to a trailer, Worst features: The lifting keel takes a winch to lift its 430 pounds straight up. (The other 340 pounds of ballast is in the hull.)"

See also
List of sailing boat types

References

External links
Video tour of an S2 6.9

Keelboats
1980s sailboat type designs
Sailing yachts
Trailer sailers
Sailboat type designs by Don Wennersten
Sailboat type designs by Graham & Schlageter
Sailboat types built by S2 Yachts